Sharking may refer to:

 Card sharking or sharping, use of skill and/or deception to win at card games
 Pool sharking (which has multiple meanings)
 Loan sharking, lending money at extremely high interest rates
 Sharking or debagging, slang for the pulling down of someone's pants, underwear, top, or other clothing, usually against their will
 Sharking, pick-up artist slang (principally British) for determined and repeated attempts to seduce a potential sexual partner